In the mathematical field of knot theory, the bridge number is an invariant of a knot defined as the minimal number of bridges required in all the possible bridge representations of a knot.

Definition
Given a knot or link, draw a diagram of the link using the convention that a gap in the line denotes an undercrossing. Call an arc in this diagram a bridge if it includes at least one overcrossing. Then the bridge number of a knot can be found as the minimum number of bridges required for any diagram of the knot. Bridge number was first studied in the 1950s by Horst Schubert.

The bridge number can equivalently be defined geometrically instead of topologically.
In bridge representation, a knot lies entirely in the plane apart for a finite number of bridges whose projections onto the plane are straight lines.
Equivalently the bridge number is the minimal number of local maxima of the projection of the knot onto a vector, where we minimize over all projections and over all conformations of the knot.

Properties
Every non-trivial knot has bridge number at least two, so the knots that minimize the bridge number (other than the unknot) are the 2-bridge knots.
It can be shown that every n-bridge knot can be decomposed into two trivial n-tangles and hence 2-bridge knots are rational knots.

If K is the connected sum of K1 and K2, then the bridge number of K is one less than the sum of the bridge numbers of K1 and K2.

Other numerical invariants
 Crossing number
 Linking number
 Stick number
 Unknotting number

References

Further reading
 Cromwell, Peter (1994). Knots and Links. Cambridge. .

Knot invariants